Filippo Damian  (born 21 April 1996) is an Italian footballer who plays as a midfielder for  club Trento on loan from Ternana.

Career

ChievoVerona 
Born in Castelfranco Veneto, Damian was a youth exponent of ChievoVerona.

Loan to Como 
On 31 August 2016, Damian was signed by Serie C side Como with a season-long loan deal. On 14 September he made his Serie C debut for Como as a substitute replacing Alessio Cristiani in the 76th minute of a 1–0 home defeat against Livorno. On 12 October he scored his first professional goal, as a substitute, in the 92nd minute of a 3–1 home win over Pontedera. On 30 October, Damian scored his second goal, again as a substitute, in the 90th minute of a 2–2 home draw against Olbia. On 7 November, Damian played his first full match, a 3–1 away defeat against Piacenza. Damian ended his loan to Como with 24 apparences, 2 goals and 1 assist.

Loan to Robur Siena 
On 17 July 2017, Damian was loaned to Serie C club Robur Siena with a season-long loan deal. On 27 August, Damian made his debut for Robur Siena in Serie C, as a starter in a 1–0 home win against Lucchese, he was replaced by Simone Guerri in the 85th minute. On 3 September, Damian played his first entire match for Robur Siena, a 0–0 away draw against Pisa. On 29 March 2018 he was sent off with a red card in the 93rd minute of a 1–0 away defeat against Pontedera. Damian ended his season-long loan to Robur Siena with 31 appearances.

Robur Siena 
On 27 July 2018, Damian joined to Serie C club Robur Siena with an undisclosed fee and a 3-year contract.

Loan to Pordenone 
On 31 August 2018, Damian was loaned to Serie C club Pordenone on a season-long loan deal. On 18 September he made his debut for the club as a substitute replacing Simone Magnaghi in the 62nd minute of a 2–1 home win over Fano. On 17 October, Damian played his first match as a starter for Pordenone, a 2–1 away win over Vis Pesaro, he was replaced after 53 minutes by Emanuele Berrettoni. On 24 March 2019, he played his first entire match, a 1–1 away draw against Ternana. Damian ended his season-long loan to Pordenone with 23 appearances, but only 6 as a starter.

Loan to Ternana 
On 2 September 2019, Damian joined Ternana in Serie C with another season-long loan with an option to buy. Four weeks later, on 28 September he made his debut for the club as a 75th-minute substitute replacing Marino Defendi in a 2–1 away win over Virtus Francavilla. On 1 December he played his first match as a starter for the club, a 3–1 away win over Catanzaro, he was replaced by Marino Defendi after 69 minutes. On 22 January 2020, Damian scored his first goal for Ternana, as a substitute, in the 92nd minute of a 3–0 home win over Rieti. Damian ended his loan with 15 appearances and 1 goal.

Ternana
On 31 January 2020, he moved to Ternana on a permanent basis and signed a 3.5-year contract with the club.

Loan to ACR Messina
On 14 August 2021, he extended his contract with Ternana until June 2024 and was loaned to ACR Messina for the 2021–22 season.

Loan to Trento
On 1 August 2022, Damian moved on loan to Trento, with an option to buy.

Career statistics

Club

Honours

Club 
Pordenone

 Serie C (Group B): 2018–19
 Supercoppa di Serie C: 2019

References

External links
 

1996 births
Living people
People from Castelfranco Veneto
Footballers from Veneto
Italian footballers
Association football midfielders
Serie C players
A.C. ChievoVerona players
Como 1907 players
A.C.N. Siena 1904 players
Pordenone Calcio players
Ternana Calcio players
A.C.R. Messina players
A.C. Trento 1921 players
Sportspeople from the Province of Treviso